In the Present Tense is a Canadian current affairs television series which aired on CBC Television in 1974.

Premise
Each episode featured interviews and analysis on a particular topic such as America in the Middle East, an exploration of inflation, political rivalry in France and coal mining in the United Kingdom. Episodes were taped on the day of broadcast, and made significant use of videotaped material.

Scheduling
This half-hour series was broadcast on alternate Sundays at 10:30 p.m. (Eastern) from 13 January to 17 May 1974. Ombudsman was broadcast in this time slot on other weeks.

References

External links
 

CBC Television original programming
1974 Canadian television series debuts
1974 Canadian television series endings